Baghrir or beghrir (Arabic:البغرير), also known as ghrayef or mchahda, is a pancake consumed in Algeria, Morocco and Tunisia. They are small, spongy, and made with semolina or flour; when cooked correctly, they are riddled with tiny holes (which soak up whatever sauce they are served with). The most common way to eat baghrir in Algeria and Morocco is by dipping them in a honey-butter mixture, but they can also be cut into wedges and served with jam. Baghrir is popular for breakfast, as a snack, and for iftar during Ramadan. On the 9th day of Ramadan, the Mozabite people of Algeria exchange baghrir as a form of tradition, which they call m'layin; they are also distributed to the poor.

Etymology 
In the Maghreb, this type of pancake is also known under other names: gh'rayf, in Tunisia and eastern Algeria (Constantine, Collo, Skikda), kh'ringu in Morocco and Algeria, [grifa, gh'rayf]; [m'layn, s. m'layna]; [gh’rayf]; [gh’rayf]; [kh’ringu, kh’ringu]; [khringu] in Algeria. This lexical diversity undoubtedly denotes a rich and ancient regional tradition. As for the word baghrir, it seems to be typical of Maghrebi-Western Arabic dialects (Morocco, Algeria), in any case it is unknown to us elsewhere. The lexicographer Mohamed Sbihi considers, in his Mu'djam, that the word baghrir is in some way an alteration of the Arabic baghir of the verb baghara; the baghir, according to the classic Arabic dictionaries, is the one who drinks without being able to quench his thirst (generally said of an animal). It is possible that the word was used in this case by allusion to the great absorbability of these pancakes, which have holes like a sponge.

See also
 List of pancakes
 Lahoh
 Crumpet
 Injera

References 

Arab cuisine
Algerian cuisine
Moroccan cuisine
Pancakes
Berber cuisine
Maghrebi cuisine
North African cuisine
Middle Eastern cuisine
Tunisian cuisine
African cuisine
Mediterranean cuisine